Women in the Prison is an 1899 painting by Hungarian painter Ottó Baditz. The painting measures exactly 87.5 x 68.5 cm and is currently on display in the Hungarian National Gallery, Budapest.

External links
Gallery of works

Hungarian paintings
Paintings in the collection of the Hungarian National Gallery
1899 paintings